The 1914–15 season was Newport County's third consecutive season in the Southern League.

Season review

League

Results summary
Note: Two points for a win

Fixtures and results

Southern League Second Division

FA Cup

Welsh Cup

League table

External links
 Newport County Archives

References

 Amber in the Blood: A History of Newport County. 

1914-15
English football clubs 1914–15 season
1914–15 in Welsh football